Epiprocta is one of the two extant suborders of the Odonata (the order to which dragonflies and damselflies belong). It was proposed relatively recently, having been created to accommodate the inclusion of the Anisozygoptera. The latter has been shown to be not a natural suborder, but rather a paraphyletic collection of lineages, so it has been combined with the previous suborder Anisoptera, the well-known dragonflies, into the Epiprocta. The old suborder Anisoptera is proposed to become an infraorder within the Epiprocta, whereas the "anisozygopterans" included here form the infraorder Epiophlebioptera.

References

External links

 
Insect suborders